Königswinter station is a station on the East Rhine Railway in the city of  Königswinter in the Rhein-Sieg-Kreis district of North Rhine-Westphalia, Germany. It is a protected as a monument. The station was opened on 11 July 1870 as part of the extension of the East Rhine Railway from Neuwied to Oberkassel.

At its core the entrance building, which was built in 1869/70, is a -storey stucco building with neoclassical influences. It has an avant-corps with three portals, covered by a gable with an oeil-de-boeuf. The station is particularly notable for an iron and glass structure that provides covered access to the island platform. In the 1950s, a glass-enclosed porch and extensions were built on both sides the station building, which were designed as the station restaurant and for the handling of freight. At the same time the interior was also redesigned.

The station is classified by Deutsche Bahn as a category 4 station. The station building belonged to the city from 2004 and was sold at the end of 2012 to a real estate company. In 2019, it was adapted to be used for a bakery. The underpass connects the platform with Königswinter's old town to the west and to the premises of the Maxion company to the east.

Notes

Railway stations in North Rhine-Westphalia
Railway stations in Germany opened in 1870
Buildings and structures in Rhein-Sieg-Kreis